Stephen Myers  (born 3 August 1946) is an electronic engineer who works in high-energy physics.

Life 
Myers earned a bachelor's degree in electrical and electronic engineering in 1968 from Queen's University, Belfast, and completed his Ph.D. there in 1972. Thereafter he worked at  CERN.
In September 2008, he was appointed CERN Director of Accelerators and Technology,  and in 2014, he was appointed Head of CERN Medical Applications.

He has been awarded honorary doctorates by the University of Geneva in 2001, by Queen’s University, Belfast in 2003, and by Dublin City University in 2017. In 2013 Queen's University, Belfast named him an honorary professor.
He was elected as a fellow of the Institute of Physics in 2003, and of the Royal Academy of Engineering in 2012.
He became an honorary member of the European Physical Society in 2013, and of the Royal Irish Academy in 2015.

He was awarded the Duddell Medal and Prize of the Institute of Physics in 2003.
In 2010 he was awarded the International Particle Accelerators Lifetime Achievement Prize "for his numerous outstanding contributions to the design, construction, commissioning, performance optimization, and upgrade of energy-frontier colliders - in particular ISR, LEP, and LHC - and to the wider development of accelerator science".
With two other CERN directors he was jointly awarded the EPS Edison Volta Prize in 2012 and the Prince of Asturias Prize of Spain in 2013.
He became an Officer of the Order of the British Empire in 2013.

External links
Scientific publications of Stephen Myers on INSPIRE-HEP

References

Living people
1946 births
Alumni of Queen's University Belfast
British nuclear physicists
People associated with CERN
Experimental particle physics
Myers
Officers of the Order of the British Empire
People educated at St Malachy's College